Tangail Polytechnic Institute or (TPI) is a polytechnic institute in Tangail, Bangladesh established in 1991.

History 
Tangail Polytechnic Institute was established in 1991 with 40 students in the first year classes of diploma in engineering in Electrical technology. With growing demands of mid level technical manpower home and abroad the institute has since greatly expanded. The institute now offers courses in seven technologies.

Location 

Photo gallery

Department 
 Electrical
 Electronics
 Computer
 Construction
 Telecommunication
 Mechanical
 Civil

Directorates 
The institute operates under the executive control of the Ministry of Education acting through the Directorate of Technical Education. The academic programmes, curriculams are maintained under the regulation of the Bangladesh Technical Education Board.

References

External links 

 Official website

Polytechnic institutes in Bangladesh
Educational institutions established in 1991
1991 establishments in Bangladesh
Tangail City
Organisations based in Tangail
Universities and colleges in Tangail District